Emanuel Handy, sometimes recorded as Emmanuel Handy, was a sergeant in the Union Army during the American Civil War, a delegate to Mississippi's 1868 Constitutional Convention, a farmer, a constable, and a state legislator in Mississippi. He was born in Copiah County, Mississippi. He served in the Mississippi House of Representatives from 1870 to 1873.

See also
African-American officeholders during and following the Reconstruction era

References

Year of birth missing
Year of death missing
Members of the Mississippi House of Representatives
African-American state legislators in Mississippi
People from Copiah County, Mississippi
Farmers from Mississippi
Union Army non-commissioned officers
People of Mississippi in the American Civil War
African-American politicians during the Reconstruction Era